Sir John Aubrey, 3rd Baronet (20 June 1680 – 16 April 1743), of Llantriddyd, Glamorgan, and Boarstall, Buckinghamshire, was a British Whig politician who sat in the English House of Commons from 1706 to 1707, and then in the British House of Commons from 1707 to 1710.

Background
Aubrey was the son of Sir John Aubrey, 2nd Baronet, and his first wife Margaret Lowther, daughter of Sir John Lowther, 1st Baronet. In 1700, Aubrey succeeded his father in the baronetcy. He matriculated at Jesus College, Oxford, on 7 April 1698, aged 17. On 20 June 1701 at St James's Church, Piccadilly, he married Mary Steally, his mother's ‘waiting maid’ whom he had got with child.

Career
Aubrey was elected as Member of Parliament (MP) for Cardiff at a by-election on 1 February 1706, on the recommendation of Thomas Mansel. He was returned again at the 1708 British general election. Despite his cooperation with Mansel, he demonstrated Whig values in Parliament. In 1709, he voted for the naturalization of the Palatines, he twice told with Whigs and against Tories, and he voted in favour of the impeachment of Dr Sacheverell in 1710. He was not put forward at the 1710 British general election. In 1710, he was appointed High Sheriff of Glamorgan.

Later life and legacy

Aubrey's wife died in 1714 and he married in 1716, as his second wife, Frances Jephson, daughter of William Jephson. It was through this marriage that he came into possession of the Manor of Boarstall. Thirdly, he married Jane Thomas at St Benet Paul's Wharf, London on 1 February 1725.

Aubrey died on 16 April 1743, aged 62 and was buried in Boarstall a week later. By his first wife, he had two sons and four daughters. He was succeeded in the baronetcy successively by both his sons John and Thomas.

References

1680 births
1743 deaths
Alumni of Jesus College, Oxford
Baronets in the Baronetage of England
British MPs 1707–1708
British MPs 1708–1710
High Sheriffs of Glamorgan
Members of the Parliament of Great Britain for Welsh constituencies
Members of the Parliament of England (pre-1707) for constituencies in Wales
English MPs 1705–1707